This is a list of proposed power stations in the Commonwealth of Australia. Australia currently has 11 proposed fossil power plants, 42 proposed renewable plants, and 8 others.

Fossil fuelled

Nuclear

Hydro

Biomass

Landfill gas

Wind

Solar

See also 

 Wind power in Australia
 Solar power in Australia
 Coal mining in Australia
 Nuclear power in Australia
 Energy policy of Australia
 Effects of global warming on Australia
 List of power stations in Australia

References

Lists of power stations in Australia
 
Power Stations In Australia
Infrastructure-related lists